The men's ski cross competition of the 2015 Winter Universiade was held at Sulayr Snowpark, Sierra Nevada, Spain seeding was held on February 13.

But it will be hold the elimination round at February 14, it informed was competition was cancelle3d.
So the results of seeding is the final results.

Results

Seeding

References

Men's cross